Ar-Rahman Mosque is a contemporary mosque in Aleppo, Syria, located on King Faisal Street. It was opened in 1994 and features a combined style of the early Umayyad architecture and modern mosques. 
  
It has a large central dome surrounded with 2 high and 4 shorter rectangular minarets. The external walls of the mosque are decorated with stones in the form of traditional Quran pages, inscribed with some verses from the Ar-Rahman sura.

Gallery

References

Mosques completed in 1994
Architecture in Syria
Umayyad architecture in Syria
Mosques in Aleppo
20th-century mosques
1994 establishments in Syria